Mahamadou Djeri Maïga (alias Mohamed Jerry Maïga or Mahamadou Maiga Djeri; c. 1972 – 22 October 2018) was a Malian politician. He was the Vice-President of the Transitional Council of the State of Azawad, established by the National Movement for the Liberation of Azawad (MNLA). After the MNLA lost the control of Northern Mali to Islamist groups, he fled to Niger.
Mr Djeri Mahamadou Maïga belonged to the Songhai ethnic group, one of the dominant ethnic groups in northern Mali. Mr. Djeri's position in the movement symbolized the inclusion of other ethnic groups in the fight for self-determination hitherto the reserve of the Tuaregs.

References

Berber Malians
Tuareg people
2018 deaths
Members of the National Movement for the Liberation of Azawad
Year of birth uncertain
21st-century Malian people